The Navy and Marine Corps Medal is the highest non-combat decoration awarded for heroism by the United States Department of the Navy to members of the United States Navy and United States Marine Corps. The medal was established by an act of Congress on 7 August 1942, and is authorized under .

The Navy and Marine Corps Medal is the equivalent of the Army's Soldier's Medal, Air and Space Forces' Airman's Medal, and the Coast Guard Medal.

Criteria
As the senior non-combat award for heroism, this award hinges on the actual level of personal "life threatening" risk experienced by the awardee. For heroic performance to rise to this level it must be clearly established that the act involved very specific life-threatening risk to the awardee.

During the mid-20th century, the Navy and Marine Corps Medal has been awarded instead of the Silver or Gold Lifesaving Medal, for sea rescues involving risk to life. This is due primarily to the creation of a variety of additional military decorations that are often considered more prestigious than the Lifesaving Medal.

Additional awards of the medal are denoted by gold or silver  inch stars.

The Navy and Marine Corps Medal was first bestowed during World War II.

Appearance
The Navy and Marine Corps Medal is an octagonal bronze medal.  The obverse depicts an eagle holding a fouled anchor over a globe.  The word Heroism is inscribed below the globe.  The ribbon of the medal is three equal stripes of navy blue, old gold, and apple red.

Notable recipients

John F. Kennedy, USN - President of the United States who was awarded the medal as commanding officer of Motor Torpedo Boat PT-109 during World War II.
James E. Williams, USN - Medal of Honor recipient, Vietnam War
Britt K. Slabinski, USN, Navy SEAL
Carl Brashear, USN, Navy Master Diver 
Don Shipley, USN - Former Navy SEAL and 'Stolen Valor' activist
Charles Jackson French, USN
 Jeremiah Diprete, Marine
 MMC(SS) John D. Wise Jr., USN - For saving the USS Dolphin (AGSS-555) and its crew when the boat was on fire and flooding, May 21, 2002.

See also 
 Awards and decorations of the United States military

References

Awards and decorations of the United States Marine Corps
Awards and decorations of the United States Navy
Awards established in 1942
Courage awards
1942 establishments in the United States